The ESL Pro League (formerly ESL ESEA Pro League; shortened as EPL) is a Counter-Strike: Global Offensive (CS:GO) professional esports league, produced by ESL. It is based on four regions: Europe, the Americas, Asia, and Oceania, and currently comprises 24 teams each season, including 12 Permanent Partner Teams. The ESL Pro League is considered to be the premier professional CS:GO league in the world and is one of the major professional leagues in esports. The ESL Pro League began as a venture between the Electronic Sports League (ESL) and E-Sports Entertainment Association League (ESEA). Its inaugural season started on May 4, 2015.

History
In early November 2014, the German-based Electronic Sports League announced the creation of the ESL Pro League as the European ESL league. On April 28, 2015, ESL announced a joint venture with the North American-based E-Sports Entertainment Association League to provide a Counter-Strike: Global Offensive league with US$500,000 in total prize money in the first season between two continents. It later expanded to fourteen teams per region and raised its prize pool to US$1,000,000, with two seasons running each year. ESL the prize pool once more in 2018 by making the teams fight for $1,000,000 in the Finals, raising the season prize pool by $250,000. In addition, the number of teams in the finals rose to sixteen, with more teams from regions other than North American and Europe participating in the Finals. In 2020, due to the onset of the COVID-19 pandemic, seasons 11 and 12 did not have a global final, instead regional finals were held in Europe and North America. In 2021, for ESL Pro League Season 13, the organization announced a changed format, with one league replacing the four regional leagues that existed prior to the pandemic. All 24 teams would travel to Europe to participate in the league, with the top 12 teams of the 24-team regular season proceeding to the finals, also in Europe. With the consolidation of the tournament into one event, the prize pool was reduced to $750,000.

Format
The first season featured twelve teams from each continent that were invited by ESL to participate in its inaugural season that started on May 4, 2015 with Team Dignitas defeating Titan. In the first three seasons, the EPL gave the top four teams in each league a ticket to the finals on an offline (LAN) tournament. Starting with Season 4, ESL decided to expand the Pro League to 28 teams, so that there would be fourteen teams per league. This also meant that six teams from each region would qualify for the offline finals. For each regular season, teams would play every team twice in its respective league, so that each team played twenty-two games for the first three seasons and twenty-four games from season four to season seven. However, in Season 7, two teams – Counter Logic Gaming and Misfits – dropped their rosters and forfeited their Pro League licenses, reducing the number of North American teams to twelve. Also in season 7, ESL decided to expand geographically by creating the Asia-Pacific and LA LEAGUE (South America) divisions, bumping the number of teams up from 24 to 40. This was later for season 9 changed to four regions as North America and South America were integrated into one region. In addition, the Europe and Americas region feature offline group play. Season 9 featured eight teams from Europe, six teams from the Americas, one team from Asia, and one team from the Oceania region.

The first three offline finals had eight teams, in which teams were split up into two groups of four in a double-elimination, GSL group format, and two teams from each group qualified for the playoffs. The playoffs featured four teams, with the semifinals being a best of three and the finals being a best of five. Starting from season four to season six, teams were split up into two groups of six and each team would play every team in its group once for the group stage. Three teams from each group qualified for the playoffs. The round of 6 and the semifinals are the best of three series and the finals are the best of five, with the exception of season four, in which the finals were a best of three. In season seven, with the EPL expansion, the number of teams went up to sixteen. In season thirteen, after EPL centralization, the finals became a 12-team event, with the top half of each group from the group stage advancing to a Single-Elimination Bracket.

Thirteen of the teams in the ESL Pro League automatically qualify each year through Permanent Partner Status, a revenue-sharing system ESL operates with the organizations of these thirteen teams. Of the other eleven teams, six qualify through the ESL World Ranking, a system ESL uses to measure teams' results from all significant CS:GO tournaments, including those not operated by ESL, and the remaining five qualify through regional qualifications. Regional qualifications occur through regional ESEA Premier seasons, with two taking place every ESL Pro League season, a spot given to each season championship in Europe and North America (totaling four spots), and one final spot was given to the winner of a playoff between the two winners of the ESEA Premier seasons in Oceania.

Unlike the Valve-sponsored CS:GO Major Championships, in which team slots are given based on the player rosters, ESL awards spots to the organization. For instance, Valve would consider SK Gaming to have won two Major Championships, as the players (FalleN, fer, coldzera, fnx, TACO) won one at MLG Columbus 2016 while under contract with Luminosity Gaming and won another at ESL One Cologne 2016 while under contract with SK Gaming. In addition, if the majority of the roster transfers to another team, Valve would give take away the spot from the old team and give it to the team that the core of the roster is headed to. At ESL One Katowice 2015, PENTA Sports made it to the top eight at the tournament, giving the players a guaranteed spot at the next major, ESL One Cologne 2015; however, players denis, Spiidi, and nex were bought out by mousesports, thus giving mousesports PENTA Sports's spot at Cologne 2015 as the majority of PENTA moved to the mousesports team. EPL would consider Luminosity Gaming, which won Season 3, to have one title and SK Gaming, which won Season 6, to also have just one title. However, a team is allowed to sell or simply give its Pro League license to another organization, as in the case of Tempo Storm transferring its roster to the Immortals organization for Season 4. 

Sh1ro, Cloud9's sniper, turned out to be the best player in Group A at ESL Pro League Season 17. The 21-year-old esportsman scored an impressive 1.49 rating, becoming the main creator of his team's success in the group stage of the championship.

Seasons
The list of seasons and the top two teams in each season are in shown below. The number next to the teams showed what positions they placed during the regular season in their respective leagues. Regional leagues were discontinued in Season 13.  According to report Strife will represents Counter-Strike: Global Offensive (CS:GO) in ESL Pro League Season 16.

Notes

Other Leagues
ESL also has two other leagues outside of Counter-Strike. Tom Clancy's Rainbow Six Siege is currently in its eleventh season. The PENTA Sports/G2 Esports core has the most titles with four, as the team won the Year 1 Season 1, Year 2 Season 1, Year 2 Season 2, and Season 8 titles. In addition to the Rainbow Six Siege league, ESL also has a Halo league. However, the two leagues are much less prominent than the Counter-Strike league as Rainbow Six only has a $248,000 prize pool compared to CS:GO's $750,000 prize pool.

See also
 Intel Extreme Masters

References